Hajigabul is a town, municipality and the capital of Hajigabul District of Azerbaijan. It has a population of 23,512. The municipality consists of the city of Qazıməmməd and the village of Balıqçı.

History
It was named after a nearby eponymous lake; the name literally means bitter lake in Azerbaijani. It was granted urban-type settlement status in 1934 and town status in 1938. In 1939, the town was renamed Kazi-Magomed (alternatively spelled Qaziməmməd and Qazıməmməd), after revolutionary Kazi Magomed Agasiyev. The original name was restored in 2000.

Transportation

Rail

Hajiqabul sits on one of the Azerbaijani primary rail lines running east–west connecting the capital, Baku, with the rest of the country. The Kars–Tbilisi–Baku railway will run along the line through the city. The railway provides both human transportation and transport of goods and commodities such as oil and gravel.

Hajiqabul's Central Railway Station is the terminus for national and international rail links to the city. The construction of the Kars–Tbilisi–Baku railway, which will directly connect Turkey, Georgia, and Azerbaijan, began in 2007 and is scheduled for completion in 2015. The completed branch will connect the city with Tbilisi in Georgia, and from there trains will continue to Akhalkalaki, and Kars in Turkey.

Economy
People are mainly employed in manufacturing and transportation and service sectors. The largest employer operating in Hajiqabul Hajiqabul Industrial Park which includes Automobile Plant by AzerMash.

Notable people
Boris Litvinchuk, Hero of the Soviet Union

References

Notes

Sources
Е. М. Поспелов (Ye. M. Pospelov). "Имена городов: вчера и сегодня (1917–1992). Топонимический словарь." (City Names: Yesterday and Today (1917–1992). Toponymic Dictionary." Москва, "Русские словари", 1993.

External links

Populated places in Hajigabul District